Major General Mian Gulam Jilani (SQA, Imtiazi Sanad) (1 March 1913 – 1 March 2004) was a two-star general officer in the Pakistan Army who, as an Indian Army officer during the Second World War had survived a Japanese PoW camp at Singapore. He subsequently rose to help negotiate Pakistan's membership in the Baghdad Pact and the Southeast Asia Treaty Organization. An ethnic Pashtun, he retired from the Pakistan Army in 1962 and was jailed 1973 for his political beliefs. Amnesty International declared him a prisoner of conscience in 1974. He escaped from custody and took political asylum in the United States in 1975.

Early life
Jilani was born in Sibi, in the Chief Commissioner's Province of Balochistan, when the British ruled much of the Indian subcontinent. He was educated at Forman Christian College in Lahore and later in Law at the Aligarh Muslim University, then in India. He completed his officer's training at the Indian Military Academy at Dehra Dun in India and was commissioned as second lieutenant on to the Special List, Indian Land Forces on 1 February 1936 and attached to the 2nd battalion the Royal Scots Regiment on 24 February 1936 for a years experience before joining his Indian Army regiment. He was accepted for the Indian Army on 24 February 1937 and posted to the 4th battalion 19th Hyderabad Regiment. His seniority as a second lieutenant was antedated to 3 February 1935 and he was promoted Lieutenant 3 May 1937. He was later appointed acting Captain and then appointed Adjutant of the 4/19th 1 October 1940.

Captured at Singapore
During the Second World War the fourth battalion 19th Hyderabad Regiment was sent to Singapore with the British Indian Army and he was captured and taken prisoner by the Japanese in 1942. He was a prisoner of war for nearly forty months. He was tortured and kept in solitary confinement for seven months during this period. Whilst a prisoner of war he was promoted Captain. He was mentioned in despatches in recognition of gallant and distinguished services in Malaya in 1942.

Shortly after World War II, the movement for independence from the British resulted in the creation of Pakistan in 1947. Jilani threw his energy and enthusiasm behind it.

Pakistan and the Kashmir Operations
He joined the newly formed Pakistan Army and was the 42nd senior most officer (PA – 42), commanding a unit of the Frontier Force Regiment. A few weeks later he took a leave of absence from the army to volunteer as a fighter in Kashmir, allegedly fighting for its "independence" and "right to join Pakistan".  In April 1948, he was appointed Commanding Officer at Gilgit where he remained until the ceasefire.

His troops played a major role in establishing what became the line of control between India and Pakistan, which has become the de facto international border and is likely to be formalized as the permanent border in the times ahead.  He fought a guerrilla war in northern Kashmir, engaged two divisions of the Indian Army and "conquered" the whole of Baltistan, when the government of Pakistan agreed to a ceasefire at the behest of the United Nations.

Relations with the United States

In 1952, as a Brigadier, he went to Washington as Pakistan's first Military Attaché to the US in Washington. He was also Military Attache for Canada and Mexico. He brought about the military aid treaty between the United States and Pakistan, for which in 1955 he was awarded the Legion of Merit by President Dwight D. Eisenhower. Pakistan awarded him the Sitara-i-Quaid-i-Azam, or Star of the Quaid, named after the founder of Pakistan.

Senior Commander
On promotion to Major General, he served as GOC East Pakistan commanding 14th Infantry Division (Dhaka), Commandant of the Command and Staff College (Quetta) (July 1957 – December 1958), Master General of Ordnance (GHQ) and GOC 15th Infantry Division (Sialkot).

As GOC 15th Div he along with (then) Brig Rakhman Gul MC Inspector General Frontier Corps served under (then) Maj Gen Attiqur Rahman MC GOC 7th Infantry Division who was the Force Commander for the Bajaur Campaign of October 1960. After the Nawab of Dir Sir Shah Jehan Khan and his son Khan Shahabud Din Khan]] of Jandol were captured on 28 October, Maj Gen Attiqur Rahman MC moved back to Peshawar and Maj Gen Mian Gulam Jilani took over as Force Commander.

Political struggle
After retiring from the army, he entered politics and became a member of the provincial assembly in the Khyber-Pakhtunkhwa (then NWFP). He was an outspoken critic of the government of Zulfikar Ali Bhutto.

On retirement from the army, he was hired by Fakhrudin Valika as a General Manager with the Valika Group in Karachi, until his entry into politics.  He joined the National Awami Party, and was elected to the Provincial Assembly of Khyber-Pakhtunkhwa from his home constituency in Swabi (now Mardan) in the General Elections of 1970. During his National Awami Party years, he was the head of the Zalmay Pakhtun, and was arrested by the Pakistan Peoples Party government on 15 February 1973.

His wife Mrs. Nancy Habiba Jilani filed a writ petition against his detention, and the judgment of the Lahore High Court was authored by Nasim Hasan Shah, J. and is reported as: Mrs. Habiba Jilani V Federation of Pakistan (PLD 1974 Lahore 153)

A smear campaign was launched against him. In a crackdown on his party, Jilani was arrested in 1973. Bhutto then attempted to bribe Jilani with offers of high positions—all to no avail. He was frequently arrested, but all charges against him were repeatedly dismissed by the courts. Amnesty International adopted him as a "prisoner of conscience" in 1974.

In jail, Jilani managed to escape from his guards during a hospital visit in 1975 and got political asylum in the United States. He became a US citizen in 1981, and died at his daughter's home in Fairfax, Virginia on 1 March 2004.

Member Provincial Assembly (NWFP) 1970–77

Bibliography
Judgments on the Constitution, Rule of Law, and Martial Law in Pakistan by Chief Justice Dr Nasim Hassan Shah, edited by Prof Dr M A Mannan (OUP 1993)
Pakistan. Problems of Governance by Mushahid Hussain & Akmal Hussain (Vanguard Books 1993) (p. 30, 87 & 90)

References

1913 births
2004 deaths
Aligarh Muslim University alumni
Amnesty International prisoners of conscience held by Pakistan
British Indian Army officers
Forman Christian College alumni
Foreign recipients of the Legion of Merit
Frontier Force Regiment officers
Indian Army personnel of World War II
Indian prisoners of war
People with acquired American citizenship
Pakistani emigrants to the United States
Pakistani generals
People from Sibi District
World War II prisoners of war held by Japan
Pakistani escapees
Escapees from Pakistani detention
Pakistani torture victims
Indian Military Academy alumni
Pashtun people